Arnold Krekel (March 12, 1815 – July 14, 1888) was a United States district judge of the United States District Court for the Western District of Missouri.

Education and career

Born in Langenfeld, Prussia, German Confederation, Krekel emigrated to the United States in 1832. He attended St. Charles College and read law to enter the bar in 1844. He was a surveyor in St. Charles County, Missouri. He was a justice of the peace there from 1841 to 1843, and was in private practice beginning in 1844. He was a county  and city attorney of St. Charles and St. Charles County from 1846 to 1850, and was editor of the St. Charles Democrat from 1850 to 1864. He was a member of the Missouri House of Representatives in 1852. Krekel served in the Union Army throughout the American Civil War as colonel of a regiment of Missouri volunteers. He was President of the state constitutional convention in 1865 during which the Missouri emancipation proclamation was approved which formally abolished slavery in Missouri.

Federal judicial service

Krekel was nominated by President Abraham Lincoln on March 6, 1865, to a seat on the United States District Court for the Western District of Missouri vacated by Judge Robert William Wells. He was confirmed by the United States Senate on March 9, 1865, and received his commission the same day. His service terminated on June 9, 1888, due to his retirement.

Other service

Krekel was a lecturer for the University of Missouri School of Law in Columbia, Missouri from 1872 to 1875. He was a founding Board Member of the Lincoln Institute, later Lincoln University, and helped raise funds for the institution along with James Milton Turner, an African American reconstruction-era political leader and educator. He is also credited with naming O'Fallon, Missouri, located in St. Charles County, after a friend, John O'Fallon.

Death

Krekel died on July 14, 1888, in Kansas City, Missouri. and was buried in Oak Grove Cemetery in St. Charles, Missouri.

References

Sources
 
 

1815 births
1888 deaths
Missouri state court judges
Members of the Missouri House of Representatives
Judges of the United States District Court for the Western District of Missouri
United States federal judges appointed by Abraham Lincoln
19th-century American judges
German emigrants to the United States
Union Army colonels
United States federal judges admitted to the practice of law by reading law
19th-century American politicians